Helen Wheels (born Helen Robbins; 6 May 1949 – 17 January 2000) was an American singer and songwriter. She was from a Jewish family. During the 70's she was involved with Punk in New York and got the name Helen Wheels from Handsome Dick Manitoba of The Dictators. She also wrote songs for Blue Öyster Cult. In 1981 she became a bodybuilder. Robert Crumb was a friend of hers and drew the album cover for her 1998 compilation album "Archetype". She died in 2000 at 50 years old, from developing an infection after back surgery.

References

1949 births
2000 deaths
Singer-songwriters from New York (state)
Punk rock musicians

Women in punk
Jews in punk rock